The Honourable Sir George Henry Monson (17 October 1755 – 17 June 1823) was a noted English amateur cricketer whose known first-class career included 10 matches from the 1786 to the 1792 season. Monson, who was a useful batsman, was a member of Hornchurch Cricket Club and Marylebone Cricket Club.

Monson was the second son of John Monson, 2nd Baron Monson, and elder brother of Lieutenant-General Charles Monson.

External sources
 Hon. GH Monson in Cricket Archive

References
 Fresh Light on 18th Century Cricket by G. B. Buckley (FL18)
 Scores & Biographies, Volume 1 by Arthur Haygarth (SBnnn)
 The Dawn of Cricket by H. T. Waghorn (WDC)

1755 births
1823 deaths
English cricketers
English cricketers of 1701 to 1786
English cricketers of 1787 to 1825
Essex cricketers
Hampshire cricketers
Surrey cricketers
Marylebone Cricket Club cricketers
Kent cricketers
White Conduit Club cricketers
Younger sons of barons
Hampshire and Marylebone Cricket Club cricketers